Cleveland Township is one of fourteen non-functioning county subdivisions (townships) in Rowan County, North Carolina that were established in 1868. The township had a population of 2,817 according to the 2010 census. The only incorporated municipality in Cleveland Township is the town of Cleveland.  Residents are served by the Rowan–Salisbury School System and the township is home to Mt Ulla Elementary School.

History
In 1831, the first post office in the general vicinity of present-day Cleveland was established. It was named Cowansville. 
In 1850 before Western North Carolina (WNC) Railroad was built, the post office and thus the town in the vicinity of present-day Cleveland was called Rowan Mills, getting its name from a large five-story flour milled owned by Osborn Giles Foard (1820-1882), who was also the first Rowan Mills postmaster. After the construction of WNC Railroad, the railroad station was named Third Creek. The post office and town kept their name Rowan Mills until 1876, when the town was incorporated and renamed into Third Creek. In 1884 township people, who were all Democrats except for three people, decided to rename the town to Cleveland, in honor of Grover Cleveland, the first Democratic president elected since the Civil War.

Significant sites

The following significant sites are located within Cleveland Township:
 Barber Farm
 Knox Farm Historic District
 Knox School
 Knox-Johnstone House
 John Phifer Farm
 Third Creek Presbyterian Church and Cemetery
 R.A. Clement School
 Christ Episcopal Church
 Thompson Veneer Company, built in 1899

Adjacent townships
Chambersburg, Iredell County – west
Cool Springs, Iredell County – northwest
Mount Ulla – south
Scotch Irish – north
Steele – southeast
Unity – east

References

Townships in Rowan County, North Carolina
Townships in North Carolina